The Skewen Dram Road was a  long mining railway near Skewen in Wales with a gauge of .

Route 

The railway was built to take coal from Dyffryn and Bryncoch to Skewen Wharf via the Skewen Incline.

In 1871 the New Neath Abbey Coal Company, who operated the dram road across New Road, was requested to install level crossing gates. These were painted white and hence gave their name to the location, which is still known as White Gates.<ref>Carole Wilsher: [http://www.spanglefish.com/neathantiquariansociety/news.asp?intent=viewstory&newsid=93831 The districts and streets of Skewen: "The streets echo with footsteps from the past".]</ref>

 Ownership 
The Skewen Dram Road was owned and operated by the Main Colliery Company Limited, the successor of the Dynevor Dyffryn and Neath Abbey United Collieries Company Limited.

The New Neath Abbey Coal Company is said to have been founded in June 1819 by the Fox family, which held 7/12ths of the company's shares and Joseph T. Price, who held the remaining 5/12ths. In 1873 the company failed, and its assets were sold to Batters & Scott on behalf of the Dyffryn Main Colliery Company. In 1874 the property was sold again to the United Company, a merger of the Dynevor Dyffryn and Neath Abbey United Collieries Company, under the directorship of John Newell Moore of Cambrian Place, Swansea. The United Company ceased to operate in 1888 and was re-incorporated as the Main Colliery Company Limited with effect from 1 May 1899.

 Accidents 
According to a contemporary newspaper report, an accident, involving the death of three men and serious injuries to two others, occurred on the evening of 20 September 1906 on the private railway of the Main Colliery Company, by means of which coals are conveyed from Bryncoch to the wharves on Neath River. A party of ten line repairers was proceeding towards the top of the Skewen, on a repairer’s trolly[sic], and was rounding a curve when a locomotive travelling on the same rails in the opposite direction dashed into the trolly. The effect of the impact was such that three of the men were seriously hurt and died before they could be conveyed home.

 Locomotives 
One of the steam locomotives was built by H.H. Price at the Neath Abbey Works. It had  cylinders,  diameter wheels at  centres, and used  of coal a day. It could climb-up a 1 in 40 (2.5%) gradient at a tremendous pace with 30 empty trams weighing  each, and rushed round a curve of certainly not more than  radius with great velocity. Neath Abbey’s price for selling such a locomotive was above £600, as confirmed in quotation of 19 April 1864.

When assets were acquired by the Main Colliery Co. Ltd. in 1889, these included four locomotives, of which two were scrapped. This company converted its narrow gauge lines to standard gauge in 1899 and advertised six locomotives for sale, of which two had been built by the Neath Abbey Ironworks, three by Pecketts and one unknown. There were three 0-6-0ST with Peckett works Nos. 501/1890, 542/1890 and 602/1896, one 0-6-0T, one more saddle tank locomotive and one completely unknown locomotive.

These two steam locomotives had been built in 1864 and 1870 to be exported to South America, but were stored or used at Neath Abbey Iron Company’s works. They were up for sale in 1899.

External links 
 Historic Neath Abbey archives to be preserved online
Historic and modern maps side by side

References 

800 mm gauge railways in Wales
Railway lines in Wales
Defunct railroads